The 2019 Ahmad Shah Abdali 4-day Tournament was an edition of the Ahmad Shah Abdali 4-day Tournament, a cricket tournament in Afghanistan. It was the third edition of the competition to be played with first-class status. The tournament was split into two phases, with the first half of the competition taking place in April and May 2019, and the second half taking place during November and December 2019.

Six regional teams competed in the tournament, with Band-e-Amir Region being the defending champions. The first round of the tournament started on 4 April 2019 and finished on 2 May 2019. Following the conclusion of the first round of fixtures, Speen Ghar Region were leading the tournament, finishing three points ahead of Amo Region. Kabul Region did not take part in the second round of matches in the tournament. After the completion of the second round of matches, Speen Ghar Region maintained their lead at the top of the table to win the tournament.

Points table

 Champions

Fixtures

First round

Second round

References

External links
 Series home at ESPN Cricinfo

Afghan domestic cricket competitions
Ahmad Shah Abdali 4-day Tournament
Ahmad Shah Abdali 4-day Tournament
Ahmad Shah Abdali 4-day Tournament
Ahmad Shah Abdali 4-day Tournament
Ahmad Shah Abdali 4-day Tournament
Ahmad Shah Abdali 4-day Tournament